Alegría is a district of the Siquirres canton, in the Limón province of Costa Rica.

History 
Alegría was created on 17 January 1996 by Decreto Ejecutivo 24931-G.

Geography 
Alegría has an area of  km² and an elevation of  metres.

Locations
 Villages (Poblados): Alto Herediana, Portón Iberia, Río Peje, Vueltas.

Demographics 

For the 2011 census, Alegría had a population of  inhabitants.

Transportation

Road transportation 
The district is covered by the following road routes:
 National Route 415

References 

Districts of Limón Province
Populated places in Limón Province